Choi Sun-ho (also Choi Seon-ho, ; born June 24, 1977) is a South Korean judoka, who played for the middleweight category. He won a total of three medals (gold, silver, and bronze) for his division at the Asian Judo Championships (2003 and 2008 in Jeju City, and 2007 in Kuwait City, Kuwait).

Choi represented South Korea at the 2008 Summer Olympics in Beijing, where he competed for the men's middleweight class (90 kg). He lost the first preliminary round match, by a koka and a superiority decision, to Egypt's Hesham Mesbah.

References

External links

NBC Olympics Profile

Living people
Olympic judoka of South Korea
Judoka at the 2008 Summer Olympics
Yong In University alumni
Sportspeople from Gyeonggi Province
1977 births
South Korean male judoka
20th-century South Korean people
21st-century South Korean people